Słupia  is a village in Końskie County, Świętokrzyskie Voivodeship, in south-central Poland. It is the seat of the gmina (administrative district) called Gmina Słupia Konecka.

The village has a population of 290.

References

Villages in Końskie County
Radom Governorate
Kielce Voivodeship (1919–1939)
Łódź Voivodeship (1919–1939)